Bizeljsko Castle is a castle in Bizeljska Vas, a village in the Municipality of Brežice, southeastern Slovenia. It consists of a residential part that forms the centre of the complex and includes a Baroque chapel, and an outer part that served a defensive purpose.

The castle was mentioned for the first time in written sources in 1404. It has belonged to the families Tattenbach and Windisch-Graetz, among others. The oldest parts of the now visible structure dates from the 14th century, and the castle has been rebuilt and extended gradually over the centuries.

Gallery

References

External links

Castles in Styria (Slovenia)
Municipality of Brežice
Buildings and structures completed in the 14th century
Cultural monuments of Slovenia